Madison Township is one of six townships in Tipton County, Indiana, United States. As of the 2010 census, its population was 1,396 and it contained 596 housing units.

History
Non-Indigenous people began settling in Madison Township around 1830, when it was still a part of Hamilton County and northern parts of the future township were Indian land. Settlers moved to the southern part of the future township first. The first Christian religious services were held in the township in 1839 as a Methodist Episcopal Church congregation meeting which was held at a school house. Tipton County commissioners ordered Madison Township to be created in June 1844.

Geography
The township was originally 36-square miles in size. In September 1846, a half mile strip of the western part of the township was given to Cicero Township and a portion of the northern area was made into Wildcat Township. This left Madison Township at 44-square miles in size.

Topography
The main waterway that flows through the township is Duck Creek, a stream that flows through the eastern part of the township. It is a tributary of Pollywog Creek. Bear Creek's eastern fork flows through the southern part of the township. The land is flat except near the southeastern corner, where Duck Creek causes some unevenness in the topography.

Flora
Historically, the township was covered with a dense forest. Walnut trees, Poplar, Oak, Ash, Elm, Maple, Beech, and Sycamore  were commonly found. Smaller numbers of Buckeye, Spicebush and Willow were found, too. Small prairies and wetlands were scattered throughout the area.

Cities, towns, villages
 Elwood (west edge)

Unincorporated towns
 Curtisville at 
 Hobbs at 
 New Lancaster at 
(This list is based on USGS data and may include former settlements.)

Adjacent townships
 Wildcat Township (north)
 Duck Creek Township, Madison County (northeast)
 Pipe Creek Township, Madison County (east)
 White River Township, Hamilton County (south)
 Cicero Township (west)

Economy

19th century
Early industry in the township comprised wheat, which was exported to Lawrenceburg, Indiana, where better prices were being given for wheat than in northern Indiana. Mills were located in Hamilton County, and Madison Township wheat was used to make flour and corn-crackers. Native peoples in the area traded deer skins, venison, bead work and other items for gunpowder, food and clothing. In 1848, the first mill was built in the township. It was owned by Gilbert Wright and sourced power from Duck Creek's west fork. Many of the first homes in the township used lumber from the mill. A second mill, operated with steam, was built in 1868, by B.F. Marshall, in Curtisville.

20th century
By 1914, the township economy was primarily agriculture based.

Education

Early history
The first school in the township was started in 1840, in a log cabin. Cole Birch was the first teacher. He was described as the "handy man of the neighborhood," and not a trained teacher. Birch helped residents with their health problems, built houses, played violin at parties, and was known for being able to "kill more deer, market more coon skins, tell more yarns, sing louder at a camp meeting and stand up under more vile whisky than any other man in the entire county."

The first frame school in the township was built in New Lancaster. It replaced a log cabin school. It was used until the early 20th century. The first public school in the township was introduced in 1854.

Today
Students in Madison Township attend schools in the Tipton Community School Corporation.

Government
 Indiana's 5th congressional district
 State House District 35
 State Senate District 20

Infrastructure
In the early 20th century, the Lake Erie & Western Railroad and a branch of the Indiana Union Traction Company traveled east to west through the township.

Major highways
  Indiana State Road 28
  Indiana State Road 37

Airports and landing strips
 Ellison Airport

Cemeteries
The township contains these three cemeteries: Cook, Hobbs and Mount Pleasant.

References

Sources

 Pershing, Marvin W. "History of Tipton County, Indiana: Her People, Industries and Institutions". Indianapolis: B.F. Bowen (1914). 
 United States Census Bureau 2008 TIGER/Line Shapefiles
 United States Board on Geographic Names (GNIS)
 IndianaMap

Footnotes

External links
 Indiana Township Association
 United Township Association of Indiana

Townships in Tipton County, Indiana
Kokomo, Indiana metropolitan area
Townships in Indiana